Pernette is a French surname. Notable people with the surname include:

Amaury Pernette (born 1986), French curler
Joseph Pernette (1728–1807), German-born Canadian merchant and politician

See also

Pernette (given name)

French-language surnames